FYVE may refer to:

 FYVE domain
 FYVE finger-containing phosphoinositide kinase
 FYVE, RhoGEF and PH domain containing